Jack Parr (21 November 1920 – 1985) was an English footballer who played in the Football League for Derby County and Shrewsbury Town.

External links
 

1920 births
1985 deaths
Footballers from Derby
English footballers
English Football League players
Derby County F.C. players
Shrewsbury Town F.C. players
Association football fullbacks